The men's triple jump event at the 2007 World Championships in Athletics took place on August 25, 2007 (qualification) and August 27, 2007 (final) at the Nagai Stadium in Osaka, Japan.



Medallists

Records

Results

Final

Qualification

Group A

Group B

References
Official results, qualification - IAAF.org
Official results, final - IAAF.org

Triple jump
Triple jump at the World Athletics Championships